Uralopronorites is a genus of very involute and smooth, medium-sized, prolecanitids with a distinct furrow along the venter and closed umbilicus.  The adult suture has 22 lobes in all, 18 of which, nine on either side, are umbilical.

Uralopronorites comes from the Upper Carboniferous (Pennsylvanian equivalent) of Kazakhstan. It is an ammonite.

References 

  Uralopronorites GONIAT-online 8/21/10
  Paleobiology Database -Uralopronorites 8/21/10

Ammonite genera
Pennsylvanian ammonites
Fossils of Kazakhstan
Ammonites of Asia